Brabazon is a British mixed-use development located on land on the former Filton Airfield in South Gloucestershire, and is a new extension to the northern fringe of Bristol.

Background
The former airfield site has been earmarked by South Gloucestershire Council for 2,675 new homes. In 2019, YTL Corporation was announced as the major developer of the site including the Bristol Arena. Construction on the first homes is due to begin in 2020 with first residents arriving in 2021.

In December 2021, YTL announced proposals to add 1,000 houses, more green space and some commercial development nearby the original site on the former Patchway Trading Estate.

Construction
The 354-acre brownfield development will include, according to YTL Developments' website:

 2,675 houses
 62 acres of employment space
 a mixed use town centre
 three new schools, doctors' and dentists' surgeries
 recreational spaces, sport and leisure facilities
 affordable housing to buy and rent
 a community centre, retirement/care provision and student housing
 a new railway station at Filton North on the Henbury Line and a MetroBus route

References

External links
 Official website

South Gloucestershire District
Housing estates in Gloucestershire